William Everett Jones (November 8, 1894 – November 9, 1977) was a member of the Wisconsin State Assembly.

Biography
Jones was born on November 8, 1894, in Calamus, Wisconsin. He attended Columbus Senior High School in Columbus, Wisconsin. During World War I, he served in the United States Army. He relocated to Columbus in 1970. Jones died in 1977 while en route to the hospital in Columbus, and he was buried in Columbus.

Political career
Jones was a member of the Assembly from 1939 to 1942. In addition, he was chairman of the Town of Calamus. He was a Republican.

References

External links
The Political Graveyard
Find a Grave

20th-century American politicians
Politicians from Beaver Dam, Wisconsin
Mayors of places in Wisconsin
Republican Party members of the Wisconsin State Assembly
Military personnel from Wisconsin
United States Army soldiers
United States Army personnel of World War I
1894 births
1977 deaths
Burials in Wisconsin
People from Columbus, Wisconsin